Francesco Iachello  (born 11 January 1942, in Francofonte) is an Italian nuclear engineer and theoretical physicist, who works mainly on nuclear and molecular physics. He and his collaborator Akito Arima are the creators of the "interacting boson model".

Biography
Iachello attained a doctorate 1964 as a nuclear technology engineer at the polytechnic institute in Turin and 1969 a doctorate in physics at the MIT Center for Theoretical Physics. Since 1978 he has been at Yale University, where he is at present J. W. Gibbs professor for physics and chemistry.

Iachello received the Chiaudano prize in 1968  and was a Fulbright Fellow in 1964. He was awarded in 1990 the Wigner Medal, in 1991 both the Taormina Prize and the Dutch AKZO Prize, and in 1993, along with Akito Arima, the Tom W. Bonner Prize of the American Physical Society. Iachello became a foreign member of the Royal Netherlands Academy of Arts and Sciences in 1996. He is also member of the Croatian Academy of Sciences. In 1997 he received the Centennial Prize of the Italian Physical Society. In 2002 he received the Meitner Prize of the European Physical Society. He has honorary doctorates from the University of Ferrara, the University of Seville, and Chung Yuan University in China.

Iachello is famous for the application of algebraic methods (Lie algebras) to the investigation of the spectra of atomic nuclei and molecules. In 1974 with Akito Arima he introduced the "Interacting Boson Model" into nuclear physics. This important model describes collective nuclear states with the help of the unitary group U(6). The underlying concept is to derive a model with pairs of neutrons and protons instead of unpaired nucleons. The pairs are treated as bosons with different quantum spin (s- and d- bosons, as named according to spin 0 and 2). In an extension of the model, the analogous effect with unpaired fermions has a description using supersymmetrical algebras.

In recent times he has worked mainly on the investigation of the quantum mechanical dynamics of molecules (e.g. quantum phase transitions, polymer dynamics) with algebraic methods, on which Iachello already began to work in 1981 (Vibron Model).

Works

 (1st edition 1987)

Arima; Iachello "Interacting boson model of collective states", Part 1 (the vibrational limit) Annals of physics Vol. 99, 1976, pp. 253–317, Part 2 (the rotational limit) ibid. Vol. 111, 1978, pp. 201–38, Part 3 with Scholten (the transition from SU(5) to SU(3)), ibid. Vol. 115, 1978, pp. 325–66, Part 4 (the O(6) limit) ibid. Vol. 123, 1979, pp. 468–92

References

External links
Homepage at Yale
Biography from APS

1942 births
Living people
21st-century Italian engineers
Italian expatriates in the United States
20th-century Italian physicists
Scientists from Sicily
Members of the Royal Netherlands Academy of Arts and Sciences
Nuclear physicists
People from Francofonte
Theoretical physicists
Yale University faculty
MIT Center for Theoretical Physics alumni
Fellows of the American Physical Society
21st-century Italian physicists